Blackhawk (stylized as BlackHawk) is an American country music group founded in 1992 by Henry Paul (lead vocals, mandolin, acoustic guitar), Van Stephenson (background vocals, electric guitar), and Dave Robbins (background vocals, keyboards). Prior to the group's formation, Paul had been a member of the Southern rock band Outlaws, while Stephenson was a solo rock artist.

In 1993, Blackhawk was signed to a record deal with Arista Nashville. Their debut single, "Goodbye Says It All", was released that year, peaking at No. 11 on the Billboard Hot Country Singles & Tracks (now Hot Country Songs) charts, and their first album (1994's Blackhawk) was certified 2× Multi-Platinum by the RIAA. Throughout the rest of the 1990s, the band continued to chart several singles, in addition to releasing three more albums and a Greatest Hits package.

Van Stephenson departed the group in 2000 due to complications from skin cancer. Randy Threet, who made his first appearance on Spirit Dancer, the band's fifth studio album, stepped in to sing high harmony.

History
Blackhawk was founded in 1992 by lead vocalist/guitarist Henry Paul, vocalist/guitarist Van Stephenson, and keyboardist/vocalist Dave Robbins. Prior to the band's foundation, Paul was a member of the Southern rock band Outlaws, and Stephenson had a pop hit in 1984 with "Modern Day Delilah". After the latter, Robbins and Stephenson began writing songs together, including several singles for the band Restless Heart. After exiting Outlaws, Paul began writing with Robbins and Stephenson as well and thus decided to form a band with them.

1993–1995: Blackhawk
In 1993, Blackhawk signed to Arista Nashville, releasing their debut single "Goodbye Says It All" that year. The song, which peaked at No. 11 on the Hot Country Songs charts in early 1994, served as the lead-off to their self-titled debut album, which also produced four more singles: "Every Once in a While", "I Sure Can Smell the Rain", "Down in Flames", and the Jeff Black-penned "That's Just About Right". These songs all reached Top Ten on the country charts. BlackHawk was certified 2 × Multi-Platinum by the RIAA for shipping two million copies in the United States.

Also in 1994, they were nominated by the Academy of Country Music for the Top New Vocal Group award, along with Boy Howdy and Gibson/Miller Band, but lost to Gibson/Miller.

1995–1996: Strong Enough
Blackhawk's second album, Strong Enough, was released in 1995. Its lead-off single, "I'm Not Strong Enough to Say No" peaked at No. 2, followed by "Like There Ain't No Yesterday" at No. 3. Both of these singles were also Number One hits on the RPM Top Country Tracks charts in Canada. However, none of the other three singles from the album reached Top Ten in either country with the exception of "Big Guitar" reaching No. 8 in Canada, and "King of the World", the final single, fell short of the Top 40. Nonetheless, Strong Enough earned the group an RIAA gold certification for selling 500,000 copies.

1997–1999: Love & Gravity and The Sky's the Limit
Love & Gravity was the title of Blackhawk's third album, released in 1997. Only two singles were released from this album: the lead-off "Hole in My Heart" at No. 31 and "Postmarked Birmingham", one of Phil Vassar's first compositions, at No. 37. The group's chart success was restored in late 1998, however, with the release of "There You Have It", which went on to peak at No. 4. This song brought Blackhawk to the Billboard Hot 100 for the first time, peaking at No. 41 on that chart. "There You Have It" was the first of two singles from 1998's The Sky's the Limit, which also produced the No. 27 "Your Own Little Corner of My Heart".

2000–2003: Greatest Hits and Spirit Dancer
In 2000, Blackhawk released their Greatest Hits collection, composed of the greatest hits from their first four albums. One of this album's newly recorded tracks, "I Need You All the Time", was a minor Top 40 hit on the country charts. Shortly afterward, Stephenson departed the group, due to complications from skin cancer, from which he died in 2001.

2005–present
BlackHawk continued to tour. 

"Down from the Mountain" was the band's sixth studio album and was released in 2011. It contained nine new songs from the band and a different version of the song "Forgiveness," which appeared on the band's previous studio album, "Spirit Dancer."

In 2015, Blackhawk released their seventh studio album, Brothers Of The Southland. A long-awaited Christmas album was released in 2019. "Just About Right:  Live From Atlanta" is an acoustic live record recorded at Eddie's Attic in Atlanta, GA, released in 2020 and featuring members of the original backing band. In 2022, a collection of demos and never-before-heard recordings titled "Blue Highway" was released.

Discography

Blackhawk (1994)
Strong Enough (1995)
Love & Gravity (1997)
The Sky's the Limit (1998)
Spirit Dancer (2002)
 Greatest Hits Live (2010)
Down from the Mountain (2011)
Brothers of the Southland (2014)
The Spirit of Christmas (2019)
 Just About Right:  Live From Atlanta (2020)
Blue Highway (2022)

Awards & Nominations
Country Music Association
 1995 Vocal Group of the Year
 1996 Vocal Group of the Year

Academy of Country Music
 1993 Top New Vocal Duo or Group
 1995 Top Vocal Group of the Year
 1996 Top Vocal Group of the Year

American Music Awards
 1995 Favorite Country Duo or Group
 1996 Favorite Country Duo or Group

References

External links
Official website
 

Country music groups from Tennessee
Arista Nashville artists
Columbia Records artists
Musical groups established in 1992
Musical groups from Nashville, Tennessee
1992 establishments in Tennessee
Vocal trios